The 2015 Pan American Junior Championships was the eighteenth edition of the biennial track and field competition for under-20 athletes from the Americas, organised by the Association of Panamerican Athletics. It was held in Edmonton, Alberta, Canada, at the Foote Field from 31 July to 2 August.

A detailed report of the event and an analysis of the results was given for the IAAF.

Medal summary
Complete results were published.

Men

Women

Medal table (unofficial)

Participation
According to an unofficial count, 418 athletes from 31 countries participated.  The announced athletes from  did not show.

References

External links
Official website

Pan American U20 Athletics Championships
Pan American
Pan American Junior Championships
International track and field competitions hosted by Canada
Sport in Edmonton
2015 in youth sport